Football West is the state governing and censoring body for soccer in Western Australia (WA). It is affiliated with Football Australia (FA), the sport's national governing body, and through FA's affiliation to FIFA. Football West's premier competition is the National Premier Leagues (NPL) WA, which is the highest league in WA and one tier below the national A-League. NPL WA is a division within the National Premier Leagues. Football West is also responsible for running Western Australia's National Training Centre in conjunction with FA and the WA Government's Department of Local Government, Sport and Cultural Industries (DLGSC). Football West also runs the Football West State Cup knock-out cup. Since 2014 the two State Cup finalists also qualify for the Australia Cup.

History
The Western Australian Soccer Association was established in July 2004 to represent the all levels of competition and the game of soccer in Perth metropolitan and regional Western Australia. The body was formed following a period of national and state review and reform, that was led by Federal and State Governments and facilitated by the Department of Sport and Recreation WA (now part of the larger DLGSC) with the objective of creating a unified State soccer body representative. The association changed its name to Football West in early 2005.

In 2014 Football West invested more than $45,000 in subsidising coaching courses to promote coach education programs in the NPL.

In May 2019, Liberal-National Coalition Prime Minister Scott Morrison pledged $16.25 million towards a State Football Centre at Maniana Reserve, Queens Park, Cannington. This figure was matched by Labor's WA Premier Mark McGowan in 2020, which meant construction of the State Football Centre could go ahead. It is due to be completed around May 2023, in time for the 2023 FIFA Women's World Cup. 

The number of registered participants in Western Australia in the 2016 season was over 44,000.

Administration
The current board members (directors) of Football West are Sherif Andrawes (Chairman), Will Golsby (Deputy Chairman), Amy Johnson, Jason Petkovic, Elizabeth Tylich, Richard Marshall, Ivy Chen, David Buckingham and Annette Tilbrook. The current Chief Executive Officer (CEO) is Jamie Harnwell, who took over the role in April 2022.

Objectives 
The objectives of Football West are:
 Develop strong customer focus and a service delivery ethos
 Ensure structural and philosophical alignment with all stakeholders
 Deliver financial and organisation sustainability through effective corporate governance
 Be passionate about improving football

Regional Associations 
 Albany Junior Soccer Association
 Great Southern Soccer Association
 Broome Soccer Association
 Carnarvon Junior Soccer Association
 Carnarvon Senior Soccer Association
 Esperance Soccer Association
 Football Federation South West
 Collie Soccer Association
 Country Coastal Junior Soccer Association
 Leeuwin Naturaliste Junior Soccer Association
 Lower South West Soccer League
 South West Soccer Association
 Geraldton Junior Soccer Association
 Goldfields Soccer Association
 Hedland Junior Soccer Association
 Karratha and Districts Junior Soccer Association
 Karratha and Districts Soccer Association
 Midwest Soccer Association
 Newman Junior Soccer Association
 Northam Springfield FC
 Peel Junior Soccer Association
 Peel Regional Football Council
 Shire of Mount Magnet
 Tom Price Junior Soccer Association
 Toodyay Soccer Club

References

External links 
 
 Football West Official TV
 Football West Official magazine, Beyond90
 Western Australian Football Website

West
Soccer in Western Australia
Sports governing bodies in Western Australia
2004 establishments in Australia
Sports organizations established in 2004